Ram Charan (born 1985) is an Indian actor.

Ram Charan may also refer to:

Ram Charan (guru) (1720–1799), Indian Hindu religious figure
Ram Charan (consultant) (born 1939), Indian-American businessman